Lists of spiral (helicoidal) tunnels and tunnels on a curved alignment on roads and railway lines worldwide.

Road tunnels
 Churchischleif, road to Isenfluh (Switzerland)
 Drammen Spiral, Norway
 on SS 659 near Formazza, Italy (full 360° turn)
 Horda Tunnel, E134, Norway
Jinjiazhuang Tunnel (金家庄隧道), world's longest spiral highway tunnel, located in Chicheng, Zhangjiakou, China
 Tagountsa Tunnel, High Atlas, Morocco. A short spiral tunnel built along a now disused military road in 1933.
 Wolonggou Tunnel (卧龙沟长隧道) a motorway tunnel between Xunhua and Linxia in China

Railway tunnels
A part of a line is bracketed, if it is located in a country other than that mentioned in the specific table:

Example: :(Lausanne – Montreux – Sierre – Visp – Brig – ) → Switzerland

Africa

South Africa

Americas

Canada

Asia

Russia

Europe

Croatia

France

Germany

Italy

Norway

Russia

Switzerland
The turn tunnels in the following table are sorted from West to East according to the location of the start point of the line.

Slovakia

United Kingdom

Oceania

New Zealand

Australia

References 

 Hans G. Wägli: Schienennetz Schweiz/Réseau ferré suisse; Schweizerische Bundesbahnen, Generalsekretariat; 1980;  (Edition 1998)
Locations partly from:
 Bundesamt für Landestopografie, Landeskarte der Schweiz, Zusammensetzung 101, Thuner See Zentralschweiz, 1:100'000, 1987
 Office fédéral de topographie, Carte nationale de la Suisse, Assemblage 104, Lausanne-Bern, 1:100'000, 1986
 Office fédéral de topographie, Carte nationale de la Suisse, Assemblage 105, Valais∙Wallis, 1:100'000, 1987
 Bundesamt für Landestopografie, Landeskarte der Schweiz, Zusammensetzung 106, Glarnerland Bündnerland, 1:100'000, 1985
 Ufficio federale di topografia, Carta nazionale della Svizzera, Carte riunite 107, Ticino∙Tessin, 1:100'000, 1987

Spiral